"Faith of our Fathers" is a Catholic hymn, written in 1849 by Frederick William Faber in memory of the Catholic Martyrs from the time of the establishment of the Church of England by Henry VIII and Elizabeth. Faber wrote two versions of the hymn: one with seven stanzas for Ireland, and another with four for England. The Irish version was sung at hurling matches until the 1960s.

In England, Scotland, Wales, and Ireland, it is usually sung to the traditional tune Sawston; in the United States, the tune St Catherine by Henri Hemy is more commonly used.

Lyrics

Faith of our Fathers! living still
In spite of dungeon, fire, and sword:
Oh, how our hearts beat high with joy
Whene'er we hear that glorious word.

Faith of our Fathers! Holy Faith!
We will be true to thee till death.

Our Fathers, chained in prisons dark,
Were still in heart and conscience free:
How sweet would be their children's fate,
If they, like them, could die for thee!

Faith of our Fathers! Holy Faith!
We will be true to thee till death.

Faith of our Fathers! Mary's prayers
Shall win our country back to thee:
And through the truth that comes from God
England shall then indeed be free.

Faith of our Fathers! Holy Faith!
We will be true to thee till death.

Faith of our Fathers! we will love
Both friend and foe in all our strife:
And preach thee too, as love knows how
By kindly words and virtuous life:

Faith of our Fathers! Holy Faith!
We will be true to thee till death.

Protestant adaptations

Many Protestant churches and hymnals use an adapted version, with a third verse altered to remove Marian references:

Or they may use:

The final line of this verse has also been adapted as: "We all shall then be truly free."

In Korean Protestant churches, the third verse is simply omitted.

References

Further reading

 

Catholic music
English Christian hymns
1849 songs
Bing Crosby songs
19th-century hymns